Accra Daily Mail was an English-language daily newspaper from Accra, Ghana. The paper, which is privately owned, was started in 1998. The daily ceased publication in January 2009 due to financial problems. In April 2009 the paper was relaunched with the name The Mail. Its frequency was also changed to biweekly.

See also
List of newspapers in Ghana

References

Biweekly newspapers
English-language newspapers published in Africa
Mass media in Accra
Newspapers published in Ghana
Newspapers established in 1998